Riders In The Sky Present: Davy Crockett, King Of The Wild Frontier is a studio recording released by the Western band Riders in the Sky on August 3, 2004. It is available as a single CD.

Riders In The Sky offers a tribute to Davy Crockett, the scout, militiaman, Congressman, and hero of the Alamo whose life became an American legend. This album is a combination of folk songs, neo-folk songs, Disney themes, and their own tunes to paint a picture of Davy Crockett that's neither totally real nor totally false, but filled with the vivid stories of the frontiersman who is part of the collective American imagination.

Track listing 
 "The Ballad of Davy Crockett" (Blackburn, Bruns) – 6:46 
 "Be Sure You're Right, And Then Go Ahead" (Ebsen, Parker) – 2:30 
 "King of the River" (Blackburn, Bruns) – 2:11 
 "Heading for Texas – 2:41 
 "Old Betsy" (Bruns, George) – 2:04 
 "The Grinning Tale" (Driftwood) – 2:40 
 "Colonel Crockett's Speech to Congress – 2:54 
 "Remember the Alamo" (Bowers) – 3:37 
 "Farewell" (Bruns) – 4:33

Personnel
Douglas B. Green (a.k.a. Ranger Doug) – vocals, guitar
Paul Chrisman (a.k.a. Woody Paul) – vocals, fiddle
Fred LaBour (a.k.a. Too Slim) – vocals, bass
Joey Miskulin (a.k.a. Joey The Cowpolka King) – vocals, accordion

References

2004 albums
Cultural depictions of Davy Crockett
Riders in the Sky (band) albums
Rounder Records albums